Yasyn-Sokan is a rural locality (a selo) in Dzhanaysky Selsoviet, Krasnoyarsky District, Astrakhan Oblast, Russia. The population was 556 as of 2010. There are 2 streets.

Geography 
Yasyn-Sokan is located 26 km northwest of Krasny Yar (the district's administrative centre) by road. Vyatskoye is the nearest rural locality.

References 

Rural localities in Krasnoyarsky District, Astrakhan Oblast